The Khabarovsk Constituency (No.69) is a Russian legislative constituency in the Khabarovsk Krai. In its previous configuration (1993-2007) the district was centred in the city of Khabarovsk (60% of district's population), its suburbs and exurbs down to Bikin. However, the Khabarovsk constituency was gerrymandered in 2016 and now includes just southern parts of Khabarovsk and large mostly rural southern and eastern Khabarovsk Krai up to Komsomolsk-on-Amur suburbs.

Members elected

Election results

1993

|-
! colspan=2 style="background-color:#E9E9E9;text-align:left;vertical-align:top;" |Candidate
! style="background-color:#E9E9E9;text-align:left;vertical-align:top;" |Party
! style="background-color:#E9E9E9;text-align:right;" |Votes
! style="background-color:#E9E9E9;text-align:right;" |%
|-
|style="background-color: " |
|align=left|Valery Podmasko
|align=left|Independent
|52,966
|19.91%
|-
|style="background-color: " |
|align=left|Nikolay Bykov
|align=left|Independent
| 52,115
|19.60%
|-
| colspan="5" style="background-color:#E9E9E9;"|
|- style="font-weight:bold"
| colspan="3" style="text-align:left;" | Total
| 266,072
| 100%
|-
| colspan="5" style="background-color:#E9E9E9;"|
|- style="font-weight:bold"
| colspan="4" |Source:
|
|}

1995

|-
! colspan=2 style="background-color:#E9E9E9;text-align:left;vertical-align:top;" |Candidate
! style="background-color:#E9E9E9;text-align:left;vertical-align:top;" |Party
! style="background-color:#E9E9E9;text-align:right;" |Votes
! style="background-color:#E9E9E9;text-align:right;" |%
|-
|style="background-color: " |
|align=left|Valentin Tsoi
|align=left|Independent
|63,411
|16.83%
|-
|style="background-color: " |
|align=left|Valery Podmasko (incumbent)
|align=left|Independent
|47,857
|12.70%
|-
|style="background-color: " |
|align=left|Nikolay Danilyuk
|align=left|Communist Party
|38,541
|10.23%
|-
|style="background-color: "|
|align=left|Irina Yuryevskaya
|align=left|Power to the People!
|24,391
|6.47%
|-
|style="background-color: " |
|align=left|Nikolay Arzamazov
|align=left|Independent
|23,607
|6.26%
|-
|style="background-color: #FE4801" |
|align=left|Feliks Kuperman
|align=left|Pamfilova–Gurov–Lysenko
|23,521
|6.24%
|-
|style="background-color: " |
|align=left|Vladimir Grishkov
|align=left|Liberal Democratic Party
|16,540
|4.39%
|-
|style="background-color: " |
|align=left|Novruz Mamedov
|align=left|Independent
|15,289
|4.06%
|-
|style="background-color: " |
|align=left|Valery Kutushev
|align=left|Independent
|13,927
|3.70%
|-
|style="background-color: #23238E" |
|align=left|Yury Berezutsky
|align=left|Our Home – Russia
|13,537
|3.59%
|-
|style="background-color: " |
|align=left|Vadim Mantulov
|align=left|Independent
|13,413
|3.56%
|-
|style="background-color: " |
|align=left|Vladimir Lipatov
|align=left|Independent
|8,099
|2.15%
|-
|style="background-color: #F21A29" |
|align=left|Viktor Koryakin
|align=left|Trade Unions and Industrialists – Union of Labour
|6,939
|1.84%
|-
|style="background-color: #FF4400" |
|align=left|Aleksey Zachesa
|align=left|Party of Workers' Self-Government
|3,855
|1.02%
|-
|style="background-color: " |
|align=left|Galina Chupina
|align=left|Independent
|3,429
|0.91%
|-
|style="background-color: " |
|align=left|Vyacheslav Mikhaltsov
|align=left|Agrarian Party
|3,420
|0.91%
|-
|style="background-color: " |
|align=left|Rudolf Leontyev
|align=left|Independent
|3,054
|0.81%
|-
|style="background-color: " |
|align=left|Aleksandr Petrov
|align=left|Independent
|2,465
|0.65%
|-
|style="background-color:#000000"|
|colspan=2 |against all
|45,884
|12.18%
|-
| colspan="5" style="background-color:#E9E9E9;"|
|- style="font-weight:bold"
| colspan="3" style="text-align:left;" | Total
| 376,870
| 100%
|-
| colspan="5" style="background-color:#E9E9E9;"|
|- style="font-weight:bold"
| colspan="4" |Source:
|
|}

1999

|-
! colspan=2 style="background-color:#E9E9E9;text-align:left;vertical-align:top;" |Candidate
! style="background-color:#E9E9E9;text-align:left;vertical-align:top;" |Party
! style="background-color:#E9E9E9;text-align:right;" |Votes
! style="background-color:#E9E9E9;text-align:right;" |%
|-
|style="background-color: "|
|align=left|Boris Reznik
|align=left|Independent
|100,782
|29.81%
|-
|style="background-color:"|
|align=left|Leonid Golub
|align=left|Communist Party
|49,511
|14.64%
|-
|style="background-color: " |
|align=left|Mikhail Vovk
|align=left|Independent
|40,899
|12.10%
|-
|style="background-color: " |
|align=left|Valentin Tsoi (incumbent)
|align=left|Independent
|30,982
|9.16%
|-
|style="background-color: " |
|align=left|Yevgeny Isakov
|align=left|Independent
|29,947
|8.86%
|-
|style="background-color: " |
|align=left|Vladimir Belyaev
|align=left|Yabloko
|13,946
|4.12%
|-
|style="background-color: " |
|align=left|Irina Azarnina
|align=left|Independent
|13,609
|4.03%
|-
|style="background-color: " |
|align=left|Aleksandr Zhirikov
|align=left|Independent
|9,642
|2.85%
|-
|style="background-color: #FF4400" |
|align=left|Vladimir Petrov
|align=left|Andrei Nikolayev and Svyatoslav Fyodorov Bloc
|4,140
|1.22%
|-
|style="background-color: " |
|align=left|Andrey Mikheev
|align=left|Independent
|2,153
|0.64%
|-
|style="background-color: " |
|align=left|Yury Kovalev
|align=left|Independent
|1,753
|0.52%
|-
|style="background-color:#000000"|
|colspan=2 |against all
|34,815
|10.30%
|-
| colspan="5" style="background-color:#E9E9E9;"|
|- style="font-weight:bold"
| colspan="3" style="text-align:left;" | Total
| 338,103
| 100%
|-
| colspan="5" style="background-color:#E9E9E9;"|
|- style="font-weight:bold"
| colspan="4" |Source:
|
|}

2003

|-
! colspan=2 style="background-color:#E9E9E9;text-align:left;vertical-align:top;" |Candidate
! style="background-color:#E9E9E9;text-align:left;vertical-align:top;" |Party
! style="background-color:#E9E9E9;text-align:right;" |Votes
! style="background-color:#E9E9E9;text-align:right;" |%
|-
|style="background-color: "|
|align=left|Boris Reznik (incumbent)
|align=left|Independent
|142,969
|52.73%
|-
|style="background-color: " |
|align=left|Mikhail Vovk
|align=left|Yabloko
|25,725
|9.49%
|-
|style="background-color: " |
|align=left|Vladimir Titorenko
|align=left|Communist Party
|16,756
|6.18%
|-
|style="background-color: " |
|align=left|Leonid Razuvanov
|align=left|Liberal Democratic Party
|12,847
|4.74%
|-
|style="background-color:#00A1FF"|
|align=left|Konstantin Zhukov
|align=left|Party of Russia's Rebirth-Russian Party of Life
|9,574
|3.53%
|-
|style="background-color:#1042A5"|
|align=left|Andrey Barzhanov
|align=left|Union of Right Forces
|8,580
|3.16%
|-
|style="background-color: " |
|align=left|Vyacheslav Mikhaltsov
|align=left|Agrarian Party
|4,395
|1.62%
|-
|style="background-color: " |
|align=left|Viktor Saykov
|align=left|The Greens
|4,212
|1.55%
|-
|style="background-color: " |
|align=left|Oleg Firtsikov
|align=left|Independent
|2,634
|0.97%
|-
|style="background-color:#000000"|
|colspan=2 |against all
|39,295
|14.49%
|-
| colspan="5" style="background-color:#E9E9E9;"|
|- style="font-weight:bold"
| colspan="3" style="text-align:left;" | Total
| 271,845
| 100%
|-
| colspan="5" style="background-color:#E9E9E9;"|
|- style="font-weight:bold"
| colspan="4" |Source:
|
|}

2016

|-
! colspan=2 style="background-color:#E9E9E9;text-align:left;vertical-align:top;" |Candidate
! style="background-color:#E9E9E9;text-align:left;vertical-align:top;" |Party
! style="background-color:#E9E9E9;text-align:right;" |Votes
! style="background-color:#E9E9E9;text-align:right;" |%
|-
|style="background-color: " |
|align=left|Boris Gladkikh
|align=left|United Russia
|71,086
|36.94%
|-
|style="background-color: " |
|align=left|Yelena Greshnyakova
|align=left|Liberal Democratic Party
|40,074
|20.82%
|-
|style="background-color: " |
|align=left|Viktor Postnikov
|align=left|Communist Party
|30,680
|15.94%
|-
|style="background-color: " |
|align=left|Igor Glukhov
|align=left|A Just Russia
|13,939
|7.24%
|-
|style="background-color: " |
|align=left|Yelena Astashova
|align=left|Yabloko
|10,367
|5.39%
|-
|style="background: #E62020;"| 
|align=left|Vladimir Titorenko
|align=left|Communists of Russia
|6,722
|3.49%
|-
|style="background: ;"| 
|align=left|Aleksey Vorsin
|align=left|People's Freedom Party
|5,525
|2.87%
|-
|style="background: ;"| 
|align=left|Andrey Petrov
|align=left|The Greens
|5,374
|2.79%
|-
| colspan="5" style="background-color:#E9E9E9;"|
|- style="font-weight:bold"
| colspan="3" style="text-align:left;" | Total
| 192,460
| 100%
|-
| colspan="5" style="background-color:#E9E9E9;"|
|- style="font-weight:bold"
| colspan="4" |Source:
|
|}

2021

|-
! colspan=2 style="background-color:#E9E9E9;text-align:left;vertical-align:top;" |Candidate
! style="background-color:#E9E9E9;text-align:left;vertical-align:top;" |Party
! style="background-color:#E9E9E9;text-align:right;" |Votes
! style="background-color:#E9E9E9;text-align:right;" |%
|-
|style="background-color: " |
|align=left|Boris Gladkikh (incumbent)
|align=left|United Russia
|54,987
|25.85%
|-
|style="background-color: " |
|align=left|Petr Perevezentsev
|align=left|Communist Party
|44,253
|20.80%
|-
|style="background-color: " |
|align=left|Aleksandr Fedchishin
|align=left|Liberal Democratic Party
|19,388
|9.11%
|-
|style="background-color: " |
|align=left|Vladimir Parfenov
|align=left|Party of Pensioners
|19,044
|8.95%
|-
|style="background-color: " |
|align=left|Igor Glukhov
|align=left|A Just Russia — For Truth
|14,950
|7.03%
|-
|style="background-color: "|
|align=left|Valery Korzunov
|align=left|New People
|14,881
|7.00%
|-
|style="background-color: "|
|align=left|Sergey Matveev
|align=left|Russian Party of Freedom and Justice
|11,695
|5.50%
|-
|style="background-color: " |
|align=left|Vladimir Titorenko
|align=left|Communists of Russia
|9,959
|4.68%
|-
|style="background-color: "|
|align=left|Babek Mamedov
|align=left|Rodina
|6,633
|3.12%
|-
|style="background-color: " |
|align=left|Ryurik Fominykh
|align=left|Yabloko
|4,153
|1.95%
|-
| colspan="5" style="background-color:#E9E9E9;"|
|- style="font-weight:bold"
| colspan="3" style="text-align:left;" | Total
| 212,733
| 100%
|-
| colspan="5" style="background-color:#E9E9E9;"|
|- style="font-weight:bold"
| colspan="4" |Source:
|
|}

Notes

Sources
69. Хабаровский одномандатный избирательный округ

References

Russian legislative constituencies
Politics of Khabarovsk Krai